Elini is a comune (municipality) in the Province of Nuoro in the Italian region Sardinia, located about  northeast of Cagliari and about  southwest of Tortolì.

Elini borders the following municipalities: Arzana, Ilbono, Lanusei, Tortolì.

References

Cities and towns in Sardinia